Vincenzo David Pellegrino (born 1967 in Liverpool, Merseyside) is an English actor who was in hospital drama Casualty from 1997–1999. He played Derek (Sunny) Sunderland, a porter.

After leaving Casualty, he worked in Where the Heart Is.

In 2004, Pellegrino returned to television as Sid Rooney, a careworker in The Story of Tracy Beaker.

In 2017, he played a London Journalist in the three part drama on BBC “Three Girls”.

Filmography

References

External links

English male television actors
Living people
English people of Italian descent
Place of birth missing (living people)
1967 births
20th-century English male actors
21st-century English male actors